The Dollarway Road is a historic road in Jefferson County, Arkansas, that was built in 1914. It was listed on the National Register of Historic Places in 1974.

History
The nation began to focus on good roads at the start of the 20th century. Arkansas didn't establish a state highway system until 1923. Before that, building and maintaining good roads was the responsibility of local road districts, which consisted of area farmers and residents without central leadership and in many cases engineering experience.  One district, Jefferson County Road Improvement District No. 4, decided to construct a concrete road from Pine Bluff, Arkansas, north to the Pine Bluff – Little Rock wagon road at the Jefferson County line.

Dollarway pavement
The concrete was topped with a layer of coal tar about 1/16 inch thick. At the edges were 45 degree slopes, which means only  of the width was level, with the slopes acting as curbs. The gravel shoulder allowed vehicles to continue on the road without stopping for oncoming traffic, which was common at the time.

  During the construction of the Toronto-Hamilton Highway, a steam shovel was used to remove two miles of Dollarway pavement. The Ann Arbor City Engineer wrote in 1917 about the durability of Dollarway construction. As I said before, after the completion of the first  pavement, the people were very enthusiastic about this  type of pavement. It continued to grow in favor in  1910 and 1911 ; then the tide commenced slowly to turn. It became evident to all that it was necessary to recarpet the concrete every two or three years, in some  cases, varying with traffic conditions, even every year. Those who owned automobiles did not like the throwing up of the tar and sand on the under side of the  fenders. In some places, where the carpeting peeled off. the concrete commenced to ravel, and sections,  varying in size, had to be cut out and replaced with  better material. It was then realized that reducing the  first cost to a minimum had caused a heavy burden of  maintenance and repair.

Tradition holds that the road was called Dollarway because it cost one dollar per linear foot to construct. The final cost was closer to $1.36 per foot. In July 1913, Little Rock, Arkansas contractors Shelby & Bateman were chosen to construct the approximately 23-mile road.  Construction began in November 1913, and the road was finished in October 1914. The Dollarway Road was the longest continuous concrete pavement in the United States when complete.

Today
The original 1974 National Register listing boundary placed the Dollarway within a park near Redfield. In 1999 the listing was enlarged to add a portion of the Dollarway still used today as Reynolds Road. This segment also contains two original Dollarway concrete bridges.

See also 
 Arkansas Highway 365
 National Register of Historic Places listings in Jefferson County, Arkansas

References

Further reading
 

1913 establishments in Arkansas
Historic trails and roads in Arkansas
History of Jefferson County, Arkansas
National Register of Historic Places in Redfield, Arkansas
Roads on the National Register of Historic Places in Arkansas
Transport infrastructure completed in 1914
Transportation in Redfield, Arkansas